Sir Thomas Galloway Dunlop Galbraith, known as Tam Galbraith,  (10 March 1917 – 2 January 1982) was a Scottish Unionist politician.

Early life
The eldest son and heir of Thomas Galbraith, 1st Baron Strathclyde, Galbraith was educated at Aytoun House, Glasgow; Wellington College; Christ Church, Oxford (MA), and at the University of Glasgow (LLB).

He served as a lieutenant in the Royal Naval Volunteer Reserve 1939–1946.

Political career
Galbraith unsuccessfully contested Paisley in July 1945, and Edinburgh East at a by-election in October 1945 before being elected for Glasgow Hillhead at a by-election in 1948. Galbraith won the seat with an increased majority, although his Labour rival's vote share was only slightly reduced. In victory, Galbraith expressed pleasure that the campaign between the parties had been "clean" and "friendly". Commenting on the by-election, an editorial in The Glasgow Herald noted that he had increased the Unionist Party's majority by a third, which it argued was "a notable achievement by a young candidate succeeding one of the outstanding Unionist members of recent years." It also criticised the view that the result was disappointing for Conservative and Unionists due to the fact that the result was not as good as that achieved in the recent Edmonton by-election, where the Conservative vote had substantially increased while Labour's vote fell significantly.

He was Assistant Conservative Whip (1950), a Government Whip (1951–57), Civil Lord of the Admiralty (1957–59), Under-Secretary of State for Scotland (1959–62), and Parliamentary Secretary to the Ministry of Transport, (1963–64).

Vassal affair
During Galbraith's time at the Admiralty, questions were raised about his connection to the Soviet spy John Vassall, a former Admiralty employee, after letters from Galbraith were found in Vassall's possession. It was thought odd that a minister would communicate by post with an official of his own department, and there was considerable speculation of impropriety in the press. Given Vassall's known homosexuality, rumours began to circulate that Vassall and Galbraith were involved with each other and that Galbraith might have shielded Vassall from discovery.

The committee of civil servants originally established to probe the Vassall affair investigated the correspondence and declared it innocent, but the verdict was not universally accepted. Eventually the Prime Minister was compelled to open a wider inquiry, conducted by three jurists. This second inquiry determined that Vassall had not been helped or favoured by any of his seniors.

Vassall later denied in his memoirs that there had been any sexual relationship between the two men.

Honours
Galbraith was President of the Scottish Georgian Society from 1970 to 1980 and was a Member of the Royal Company of Archers. He was knighted (KBE) in 1981.

Death and aftermath
Galbraith died at the start of 1982, while still a Member of Parliament. He had successfully fought ten elections and, with 33 years of service, was Scotland's longest-serving MP. Prime Minister Margaret Thatcher, in response to his death, said she was "deeply saddened by his death, especially so soon after his knighthood had been announced." The Glasgow Herald claimed he was known "as the quiet man of Scottish politics".

Galbraith's death triggered a high-profile by-election for the Hillhead seat which would have a major impact on British politics. In the immediate aftermath of the news that Galbraith had died, Denis Sullivan, the chairman of the newly established Social Democratic Party in Scotland, indicated that the majority of the party in Scotland wished one of the SDP's founders, and former Labour Chancellor of the Exchequer, Roy Jenkins, to be their candidate at the by-election. Jenkins ultimately won the contest, enabling him to emerge as the person who would lead the SDP–Liberal Alliance at the next general election.

Marriage and family
Galbraith married Simone Clotilde Fernande Marie Ghislaine Blicquy on 11 April 1956. They had three children:

 (Anne Marie) Ghislaine du Roy Galbraith (born 14 December 1957)
 Thomas Galloway Dunlop du Roy de Blicquy Galbraith, 2nd Baron Strathclyde (born 22 February 1960)
 Charles William Du Roy De Blicquy Galbraith (born 20 May 1962)

Galbraith predeceased his father, the 1st Baron. His elder son succeeded as 2nd Baron in 1985 and was subsequently a Conservative junior Minister, Chief Whip in the Lords and Leader of the House of Lords.

References

1917 births
1982 deaths
Alumni of the University of Glasgow
Alumni of Christ Church, Oxford
Royal Navy officers
Unionist Party (Scotland) MPs
Knights Commander of the Order of the British Empire
Lords of the Admiralty
Members of the Privy Council of the United Kingdom
Members of the Parliament of the United Kingdom for Glasgow constituencies
People educated at Wellington College, Berkshire
Politicians from Glasgow
Scottish Conservative Party MPs
UK MPs 1945–1950
UK MPs 1950–1951
UK MPs 1951–1955
UK MPs 1955–1959
UK MPs 1959–1964
UK MPs 1964–1966
UK MPs 1966–1970
UK MPs 1970–1974
UK MPs 1974
UK MPs 1974–1979
UK MPs 1979–1983
Royal Naval Volunteer Reserve personnel of World War II
Treasurers of the Household
Heirs apparent who never acceded
Members of the Royal Company of Archers
Hillhead
Politicians awarded knighthoods
Ministers in the third Churchill government, 1951–1955
Ministers in the Eden government, 1955–1957
Ministers in the Macmillan and Douglas-Home governments, 1957–1964